"Jars" is the first single from Chevelle's fifth studio album Sci-Fi Crimes. It was released to radio stations on June 23, 2009 and also as a digital download on Chevelle's website. Drummer Sam Loeffler told 99.3 The Fox that this song's subject matter reflects the quirky themes of Sci-Fi Crimes. He explained that the song is, "a kind of a play on words. It's saving the environment. It's a joke about saving the environment and it's about literally taking the earth, and putting it into jars to save it for later. It's very tongue in cheek."

This song is featured in the game Tony Hawk: Ride.

Music video
The official music video was released on August 25, 2009. It features the band singing at night, on a wheat field, while illustrating the story of a man kidnapped in a speeding car, who tries to escape. The video has two alternate endings, both starting out when the man takes control of the driver's seat and remove a brick from the gas pedal, slowing the car down. A note found on the brick reads "Croatoan." One ending features an extremely brief shot of the man looking up in shock as the car explodes. The second ending features the man safely running out of the car, followed by the explosion.

The band has stated in multiple interviews that they had no involvement in the video's development and do not understand the video's meaning, assuming there is one.

Track listing

Charts

Weekly charts

Year-end charts

Certifications

References

External links 
 Video on YouTube

2009 singles
Chevelle (band) songs
2009 songs
Epic Records singles
Songs written by Sam Loeffler
Songs written by Pete Loeffler
Environmental songs
Songs about climate change